Senekal is a surname. Notable people with the surname include:

Dewald Senekal (born 1981), South African rugby union player and coach
Heino Senekal (born 1975), Namibian rugby union player
Ischke Senekal (born 1993), South African discus thrower

See also
 Senekal